Adolph Friedrich Kunike (25 February 1777, Greifswald - 17 April 1838, Vienna) was a German-born Austrian lithographer, illustrator and publisher.

Biography 
His father is believed to have been Adolf Eberhard Kunike, a clerk and arithmetic teacher at the Greifswald primary school. Little is known of his early life and education. 

In 1804, after apparently having received a degree in philosophy, he studied art at the Academy of Fine Arts Vienna. From 1808 to 1810, he studied history painting in Rome. In 1816, he made the acquaintance of  Alois Senefelder, the inventor of lithography. Shortly after, he helped the publisher Carl Gerold (1783-1854) set up his printing works to handle lithographs.

A year later, he opened his own lithographic "institute" in Vienna. After several years of producing his own works, he limited himself to managing the company and acquiring other artist's works; especially landscapes and portraits. Perhaps his best known publication is Zwey hundert vier und sechzig Donau-Ansichten nach dem Laufe des Donaustromes von seinem Ursprung bis zu seinem Ausflusse in das Schwarze Meer ... (Two hundred and sixty-four Danube views following the course of the Danube stream from its origin to its outflow into the Black Sea ...), which was published in three editions (1820, 1824, 1826). A majority of the pictures were the work of Jakob Alt.

His company took students and made contributions to the local production of paper; bypassing the expensive papers imported from Switzerland. After his death, his widow operated the company, until her death in 1845, when it was acquired by Matthias Trentsensky, one of Kunike's former students.

Sources 
 Biography, from the Biographisches Lexikon des Kaiserthums Oesterreich @ WikiSource

External links 

 
 
 

1777 births
1838 deaths
German lithographers
German publishers (people)
German illustrators
Academy of Fine Arts Vienna alumni
People from Greifswald
German emigrants to Austria